The 2021 CONCACAF Futsal Championship was the 7th edition of the CONCACAF Futsal Championship, the quadrennial international futsal championship organised by CONCACAF for the men's national teams of the North, Central American and Caribbean region. The tournament was originally scheduled to be held in Guatemala City, Guatemala between 1–10 May 2020. However, on 19 March 2020, CONCACAF announced the decision to postpone the tournament due to the COVID-19 pandemic. On 11 February 2021, CONCACAF confirmed Guatemala as host and that the dates are going to be May 3–9, 2021.

Same as previous editions, the tournament acted as the CONCACAF qualifiers for the FIFA Futsal World Cup. The top four teams of the tournament qualified for the 2021 FIFA Futsal World Cup (originally 2020 but postponed due to COVID-19 pandemic) in Lithuania as the CONCACAF representatives.

Costa Rica, the defending champions, won their third straight and fourth overall title. They, along with runners-up the United States, third-placed Guatemala, and fourth-placed Panama, qualified for the 2021 FIFA Futsal World Cup.

Teams
The 41 CONCACAF teams were ranked based on the CONCACAF Futsal Ranking as of February 2020. A total of 20 teams originally entered the tournament. The highest-ranked 12 entrants would have advanced directly to the group stage of the final tournament, while the lowest-ranked eight entrants would have had to participate in the qualifying stage, where winners of the four matchups (played as two-game series) would have advanced to the group stage of the final tournament.

On 11 February 2021, CONCACAF announced that a total of 16 teams were going to play in the tournament. On 12 April 2021, CONCACAF announced that only 13 teams were going to play in the tournament.

Championship years are in bold, hosting years are in italics

Notes

Venues
The matches were played at the Domo Polideportivo de la CDAG in Guatemala City. Before the postponement of the tournament, matches were originally also to be played at the Teodoro Palacios Flores Gymnasium.

Draw
The draw for the group stage took place on 20 February 2020, 14:00 EST (UTC−5), at the CONCACAF Headquarters in Miami. The 16 teams, which included the 12 which entered the group stage and the four qualifying stage matchups winners, were drawn into four groups of four teams. Based on the CONCACAF Futsal Ranking, the 12 teams which entered the group stage were distributed into three pots, with teams in Pot 1 assigned to each group prior to the draw, as follows:

The qualifying stage matchups were determined based on the CONCACAF Futsal Ranking, with the highest-ranked team playing the lowest-ranked team, etc. The qualifying stage winners 1, 2, 3 and 4 were then placed in groups A, B, C and D respectively.

Original draw
The original draw results involving the 20 teams were as follows:

Following the withdrawals of Sint Maarten, Curaçao, Saint Kitts and Nevis, and Puerto Rico, only 16 teams were left, so the qualifying stage was no longer necessary, and the 16 remaining teams were placed in the four groups as before as there were four teams in each group. Following the withdrawals of Guadeloupe, Martinique, and French Guiana, only 13 teams were left, and as there were only two teams left in Group A, to ensure that each group had a minimum of three teams, Dominican Republic were moved from Group C to Group A.

Match officials
The list of match officials were announced on 20 April 2021.

Squads

Each team must register a squad of 14 players, two of whom must be goalkeepers.

Group stage
The top two teams in each group advance to the quarter-finals.

Tiebreakers
The ranking of teams in each group is determined as follows (Regulations Article 12.7):
Points obtained in all group matches (three points for a win, one for a draw, zero for a loss);
Goal difference in all group matches;
Number of goals scored in all group matches;
Points obtained in the matches played between the teams in question;
Goal difference in the matches played between the teams in question;
Number of goals scored in the matches played between the teams in question;
Fair play points in all group matches (only one deduction could be applied to a player in a single match):
Yellow card: −1 points;
Indirect red card (second yellow card): −3 points;
Direct red card: −4 points;
Yellow card and direct red card: −5 points;
Drawing of lots.

All times are local, CST (UTC−6).

Group A

Group B

Group C

Group D

Knockout stage
In the knockout stage, extra time and penalty shoot-out are used to decide the winner if necessary.

Bracket

Quarter-finals
Winners qualify for 2021 FIFA Futsal World Cup.

Semi-finals

Third place match

Final

Qualified teams for FIFA Futsal World Cup
The following four teams from CONCACAF qualified for the 2021 FIFA Futsal World Cup.

1 Bold indicates champions for that year. Italic indicates hosts for that year.

Awards
The following awards were given at the conclusion of the tournament:
Best Player Award:  Milinton Tijerino
Young Player Award:  Tomas Pondeca
Top Scorer Award:  Carlos Pérez (8 goals)
Best Goalkeeper Award:  Cesar Vargas
Fair Play Award:

References

External links
Futsal, CONCACAF.com

2021
Concacaf
2021 in futsal
Futsal
2020–21 in Guatemalan football
International futsal competitions hosted by Guatemala
Sports events postponed due to the COVID-19 pandemic
May 2021 sports events in North America